Fear Factor: Khatron Ke Khiladi, Jigar Pe Trigger is the ninth season of Fear Factor: Khatron Ke Khiladi, an Indian reality and stunt television series premiered on 5 January 2019 and aired on Colors TV. The series was produced by Endemol Shine India. Filmed in Argentina. It was hosted by Rohit Shetty. For the first time, the finale was broadcast live on 10 March 2019 to promote Rising Star 3 and Akshay Kumar's Kesari. The season ended on 10 March 2019 with Punit Pathak declared as the winner while Aditya Narayan became the 1st runner up.

Contestants

Elimination chart

 Punit proxies Aditya due to injury
 Ridhima proxies Avika due to injury
 Stunts performed with an additional disadvantage
 Ridhima proxies Bharti due to injury
 Harsh proxies Bharti due to injury

 Winner
 Runner Up
 Finalists
 Ticket To Finale
 Lost Task
 Won First Task
 Was Safe from Elimination stunt
 The contestant lost the stunt during the Ticket To Finale Race
 Bottom Position
 Saved
 Eliminated
 Wild Card Entry
 Injury/Health Hault
 Not in Competition
 N/A
 Disqualified

Reception 
In its first week, the show was ranked in the second position in the most popular shows in India. The show has received a number of Target rating point, 14277 impressions. During second week, the show received 13513 impressions with second position. It came live on 10 March 2019 on its Grand Finale for the live audition of the 1st contestant of rising star 3.This season was a great success.

Guest appearances 
Ranveer Singh (Week 8) - to promote Gully Boy. 

Haarsh Limbachiyaa (Week 9) - to cheer Bharti Singh. 

Jasmin Bhasin and Haarsh Limbachiyaa (Week 10) - to perform an elimination stunt in place of Bharti Singh after she was injured. 

Grand finale

Former Host Akshay Kumar appeared to perform a stunt and to promote Kesari. The Former host gave Kesari challenge to the contestants. 

Shankar Mahadevan, Neeti Mohan, Diljit Dosanjh &  Usha Timothy (Contestant)  and  other contestants of Rising Star India (season 3) appeared to promote the new season of Rising Star. Abhishek Saraph (Contestant) appeared for a live audition for Rising Star 3.

References

External links
 
 Live Episodes

2019 Indian television seasons
09
Colors TV original programming